The Scotty Munro Memorial Trophy is awarded annually to the regular season champion of the Western Hockey League. It is named after one of the league's founders, Scotty Munro.  Munro served as the general manager of the Estevan Bruins, and later  as the head coach and general manager of the Calgary Centennials.

List of winners

Blue background denotes team also won league championship.

See also
Hamilton Spectator Trophy - OHL
Jean Rougeau Trophy - QMJHL
List of Canadian Hockey League awards

References

Western Hockey League trophies and awards